Tour Signal was a proposed skyscraper in La Défense and in Puteaux, France.

Design and development
Medea and Layetana were the developers with Ateliers Jean Nouvel as architects.

Location
West Gate was chosen as the location for the building in order to open the La Défense district to the municipality of Puteaux. The project’s ambition was to create a stronger polarity at the heart of the Île-de-France and develop a major attraction while relating the project to its natural and built environment and, lastly, embodying the various elements which strengthen the feeling that the project belongs in the district.

Outcome
This project has been cancelled. In 2009, Medea and Layetana announced they are not involved in the project anymore, and the new president of the EPAD Joëlle Ceccaldi-Raynaud declared her opposition to the tower which looks like an unaesthetic "monolith".

Structural type: highrise
Architectural style: modern
Materials: glass, steel and concrete
Design: http://skyscraperpage.com/cities/?buildingID=76763

Notes

Unbuilt buildings and structures in France